David Gibbins (born 1962) is an underwater archaeologist and a bestselling novelist.

Early life
Gibbins was born in 1962 in Saskatoon, Saskatchewan, Canada, to British parents who were academic scientists. He is related to the Victorian historian Henry de Beltgens Gibbins and to Brigadier Henry John Gordon Gale, DSO and Bar. After growing up in Canada, New Zealand and England he attended the University of Bristol, where he was awarded a First Class Honours Degree in Ancient Mediterranean Studies. He spent part of 1984 in Turkey funded by a Travel Scholarship from the British Institute of Archaeology in Ankara. In 1984 he was awarded a Research Scholarship by Corpus Christi College, University of Cambridge, where he completed a PhD in archaeology in 1991.

He qualified as a scuba diver in Canada at the age of 15, and since then has dived extensively around the world.

Career

Academic career
From 1991 to 1993 he held a Postdoctoral Fellowship at the University of Cambridge from the Canadian Social Sciences and Humanities Research Council. From 1993 to 2000 he was a lecturer in the School of Archaeology, Classics and Oriental Studies at the University of Liverpool, and from 1999 to 2001 he was an Adjunct Professor of the Institute of Nautical Archaeology. During the 1980s and 1990s he led many expeditions to investigate ancient shipwrecks and submerged ruins in the Mediterranean, including Roman shipwrecks off Sicily and the harbour of ancient Carthage. In 1999–2000 he was part of an international team excavating a 5th-century BC shipwreck off Turkey. His publications on ancient shipwreck sites have appeared in scientific journals, books and popular magazines.

Since 2002 he had been a full-time writer and independent scholar. In 2015 he co-founded the research group Cornwall Maritime Archaeology, which has made numerous shipwreck discoveries off south-west England. In 2016 he rediscovered the wreck of the Schiedam, a ship involved in the evacuation of English Tangier in 1684 and associated with Samuel Pepys, and in 2018 the site of the President, an English East Indiaman. In 2019 on another wreck he discovered a unique 16th century copper-alloy statuette of the crucified Christ attributable to Guglielmo della Porta.

Writing
On leaving academia he became a novelist, writing archaeological thrillers derived from his own background. His novels have sold over three million copies and have been London Sunday Times and New York Times bestsellers. His first novel, Atlantis, published in the UK in 2005 and the US in 2006, was published in 30 languages. Since then he has written ten further novels which have been published in more than 200 editions internationally. His main series is based on the fictional maritime archaeologist Jack Howard and his team, and forms contemporary novels involving an archaeological backdrop. He has also written two historical novels set in ancient Rome.

Honours
He is a Winston Churchill Memorial Trust Fellow, for which he received the Churchill Medallion of the Trust. He is a Fellow of the Royal Geographical Society and a Fellow of the Royal Society of Arts.

Select bibliography

Fiction

Jack Howard series
 Gibbins, David. 2005. Atlantis. London: Headline and New York: Bantam Dell. 
 Gibbins, David. 2006. Crusader Gold. London: Headline and New York: Bantam Dell. 
 Gibbins, David. 2008. The Last Gospel. (The Lost Tomb in US). London: Headline and New York: Bantam Dell. 
 Gibbins, David. 2009. The Tiger Warrior. London: Headline and New York: Bantam Dell. 
 Gibbins, David. 2010. The Mask of Troy. London: Headline and New York: Bantam Dell. 
 Gibbins, David. 2011. The Gods of Atlantis. (Atlantis God in US). London: Headline and New York: Bantam Dell (2012). 
 Gibbins, David. 2013. Pharaoh. London: Headline and New York: Bantam Dell. 
 Gibbins, David. 2014. Pyramid. London: Headline and New York: Bantam Dell. 
 Gibbins, David. 2016. Testament. London: Headline and New York: Thomas Dunne Books. 
 Gibbins, David. 2018. Inquisition. London: Headline and New York: Thomas Dunne Books.

Total War Rome series
 Gibbins, David. 2013. Destroy Carthage. London: Macmillan and New York: Thomas Dunne Books. 
 Gibbins, David. 2015. The Sword of Attila. London: Macmillan and New York: Thomas Dunne Books.

Non-fiction
 Gibbins, David, 1988. "Surgical instruments from a Roman shipwreck off Sicily." Antiquity 62 (235), pp. 294–7.
 Edge, C.J. & Gibbins, D.J. 1989. "Underwater discovery of Roman surgical instruments", British Medical Journal. 298, pp. 1645-6.
 Gibbins, David. 1990. "The hidden museums of the Mediterranean." New Scientist 128 (1739), pp. 35–40.
 Gibbins, David and Christopher Chippindale (editors), 1990. "Maritime archaeology." Antiquity 64 (243), pp. 334–400.
 Gibbins, David, 1990. "Analytical approaches in maritime archaeology: a Mediterranean perspective". Antiquity 64 (243), pp. 376–389.
 Gibbins, David and Christopher Chippindale, 1990. "Heritage at sea: proposals for the better protection of British archaeological sites underwater". Antiquity 64 (243), pp. 390–400.
 Gibbins, David. 1993. "Bronze Age wreck's revelations." Illustrated London News 281 (7116), pp. 72–3.
 Gibbins, David, 1993. "Das im Mittelmeer verborgene Museum." Mannheimer Forum 92/93. Ein Panorama der Naturwissen schaften. Mannheim: Boehringer Mannheim, pp. 175–243.
 Gibbins, David, 1995. "What shipwrecks can tell us." Antiquity 69:263, pp. 408–411.
 Gibbins, David J.L., Mike M. Emery and Keith J. Mathews, 1996. The Archaeology of an Ecclesiastical Landscape. Chester Archaeology Excavation and Survey Report No. 9. Chester City Council/The University of Liverpool.  
 Gibbins, David, 1997. "Deleta est Carthago?" Antiquity 71 (271), pp. 217–219.
 Gibbins, David. 1998. "Maritime archaeology". in Shaw, I. and R. Jameson (editors) Dictionary of Archaeology. Oxford: Blackwell. 
 Gibbins, David. 2000. "Classical shipwreck excavation at Tektas Burnu, Turkey." Antiquity 74:283, pp. 199–201.
 Gibbins, David. 2001. "Shipwrecks and Hellenistic trade." in Zofia H. Archibald et al. (editors), Hellenistic Economies. London/New York: Routledge, pp. 273–312. 
 Gibbins, David and Jonathan Adams (editors), 2001. Shipwrecks. World Archaeology 32.3. London: Routledge. ISSN 0043-8243
 Gibbins, David and Jonathan Adams, 2001. "Shipwrecks and maritime archaeology." World Archaeology, 32:3, pp. 279–291.
 Gibbins, David. 2001. "A Roman shipwreck of c. AD 200 at Plemmirio, Sicily: evidence for north African amphora production during the Severan period." World Archaeology 32.3, pp. 311–334.
 Gibbins, David. 2019. "The 9th Lancers and the assault on the 'Qaudrilateral' during the Battle of the Somme, 15 September 1916. The Chapka (Regimental Journal of the Royal Lancers (Queen Elizabeth's Own)) 2018: 138–41.

Footnotes

References
 Sue Fox, 'Best of Times, Worst of Times: David Gibbins', London Sunday Times, December 4, 2005 .

External links
 David Gibbins official website
 David Gibbins on website of agency Luigi Bonomi Associates
 Amazon.co.uk David Gibbins Author Page
 Amazon.com David Gibbins Author Page
 David Gibbins at the Internet Book List
 Fantastic Fiction David Gibbins Author Page
 Total War Rome series

1962 births
Living people
Alumni of Corpus Christi College, Cambridge
Alumni of the University of Bristol
Atlantis
Canadian archaeologists
Canadian non-fiction writers
Canadian male novelists
Canadian underwater divers
Writers from Saskatoon
Canadian thriller writers
Underwater archaeologists
Fellows of the Royal Geographical Society
Male non-fiction writers